This is a list of educational institutions in Gorakhpur, Uttar Pradesh, India

Schools

Air Force School, Gorakhpur
St. Joseph's School, Gorakhnath, Gorakhpur
Springer Public School, Industrial Area, Bargadwa, Gorakhpur
Central Academy Senior Secondary School, Gorakhpur
Central Hindu School, Jharkhandi
Hallmark World School, Medical College road, Gorakhpur
Mahatma Gandhi Inter College, Bank Road, Gorakhpur
Stepping Stone Inter College, Surajkund
Jawahar Navodaya Vidyalaya, Jungle Agahi Pipiganj
Jublee Inter College, Bakshipur, Gorakhpur
D. B. Inter College
Army public school, Gorakhpur 
Delhi public school, Maniram, Gorakhpur 
GD Goyanka public school,Gorakhpur 
Sainik School(upcoming),Gorakhpur
Little Flower School , Gita Vatika 
Little Flower School , Chargawan

Colleges
Baba Raghav Das Medical College
GOVERNMENT PHARMACY COLLEGE
Veer Bahadur Singh Sports College, Gorakhpur
Saheed Raja Hari Prasad Mall Rajkiya Homoeopathic Medical College & Hospital, Barhalganj, Gorakhpur
 State Institute of Hotel Management (Upcoming)
 Mahamaya Polytechnic of Information Technology, Hariharpur, Gorakhpur. [12]

List of Institutes affiliated with Dr. A.P.J. Abdul Kalam Technical University, Lucknow, Uttar Pradesh running in Gorakhpur city

Universities
 All India Institute of Medical Sciences, Gorakhpur
 Deen Dayal Upadhyay Gorakhpur University
 Madan Mohan Malaviya University of Technology
 Mahayogi Gorakhnath University
 Maha Yogi Guru Gorakhnath Ayush University

Other Institutes
 National Institute of Electronics & Information Technology , (NIELIT Gorakhpur) 
 The Brokencap  , (The Brokencap)

References

Gorakhpur
Gorakhpur
 
Lists of universities and colleges in Uttar Pradesh